In computer architecture, millicode is a higher level of microcode used to implement the instruction set of a computer.  Millicode runs on top of the microcoded instructions and uses those instructions to implement more complex instructions visible to the user of the system.  Implementation of millicode requires a special processor mode called millimode that provides its own set of registers, and possibly its own special instructions invisible to the user.

IBM invented both the concept and the term millicode for the System/390 9672-G4 processor in 1997.  The following are cited as advantages of millicode:
 More complex instructions can easily be constructed from several millicode instructions.
 Construction of a compatible line of computer models with different performance is simplified. 
 Millicode instructions can bypass CPU cache to improve performance.
 Instructions can update multiple storage locations without concern for being interrupted.
 Millicode can execute instructions at a higher privilege level without involving the operating system.
 Millicode can provide  a complex instruction as if it were a subroutine, making user code smaller.

The "i370" code for the "Capitol" chipset used in some ES/9370 models was similar to millicode, in that it was written as a combination of System/370 instructions and code that had access to special hardware features.

See also
 PALcode

References

External links
  

Central processing unit
Instruction processing